In ancient Greece, Atthidographers (atthidographos) were local historians of Attica.  They wrote histories of Athens called Atthides (singular: Atthis).  Atthidography is the best-attested genre of local history from the ancient Greek world, with fragments of more than fifty authors preserved.

The first Atthidographer was Hellanicus of Lesbos, and the first Athenian Atthidographer was Cleidemus. Other Atthidographers include Androtion, Phanodemos, Demon, and Melanthios. The last Atthidographer was Philochorus. The genre in which these authors worked is referred to as Atthidography.

References

History of Athens
Classical-era Greek historians
Writers of lost works
Ancient Greek historians